Coralla or Koralla was a town of ancient Pontus on a cape of the same name. It is placed by Arrian, and the anonymous author of the Periplus, 100 stadia east of Philocaleia, and Philocaleia is 110 stadia east of Tripolis, a well-known position.

That site is located near today's town of Eynesil on the Görele Point between Giresun and Trabzon on the Black Sea Coast of Anatolia, Turkey.

References

Populated places in ancient Pontus
Former populated places in Turkey
History of Giresun Province